Greeneville, the county seat of Greene County was established in the late eighteenth century, and is one of the most important towns in historic East Tennessee. Although many of the early buildings have been destroyed, there remain yet a large number of buildings important from either a historical or architectural standpoint.

The Greeneville Historic District consists of an area a block in each direction of Main Street from McKee Street to Nelson Street, comprising an area of about 135 acres containing approximately 175 structures.

Greeneville was established in 1783  around a spring, which is located almost in the heart of town. It was named in honor of General Nathanael Greene of Revolutionary War fame, and was settled by the Scotch-Irish. Its location along important early trade and stage routes caused it to become an important community in the years before the Civil War. Its citizens became prosperous enough to build substantial dwellings, and places of business, many of which form the heart of the historic district.

List of historic structures

Other images

References

External links

Buildings and structures in Greene County, Tennessee
Historic districts on the National Register of Historic Places in Tennessee
Greeneville, Tennessee
National Register of Historic Places in Greene County, Tennessee
Scotch-Irish American culture in Tennessee